HMS Wilton was a Type 2  of the Royal Navy that served in the Second World War.

Construction
Wilton was ordered from Yarrow Shipbuilders, Scotstoun on 4 September 1939, one of 17 Hunt-class destroyers ordered on that day as part of the 1939 Emergency War Programme. The ship was  laid down on 7 June 1940 and was launched on 17 October 1941, commissioning (with the pennant number L128 on 18 February 1942.  She was named after "The Wilton Hunt", an annual fox hunt held in Wiltshire. During Warship Week in 1942 she was adopted by the civil community of East Retford in Nottinghamshire.

Wartime service
On completion in 1942 Wilton was sent to Scapa Flow. She took part in escort duties in support of the Russian Convoys. At the end of 1942 she served in the Mediterranean, including support for the Sicily landings in July of the following year.

In 1944 she continued operations in the Mediterranean on convoy duties, and support for operations in the Adriatic, including Naval gunfire support. She remained there until February 1945 when she returned to the UK. In June 1945 she was nominated for service in the Far East and travelled to Simonstown for a refit to prepare for deployment.

Post war
In 1945 and 1946 Wilton underwent a refit at Simonstown in South Africa, returning to Devonport on 10 February 1946 for transfer to the Reserve Fleet. In December 1949 she recommissioned for service with the 4th Training Flotilla at Rosyth. In 1952 she was again reduced to reserve. She was placed on the disposal list in 1959 and sold for scrapping. She arrived at the breakers yard at Faslane on 30 November 1959.

References

Publications
 
 

 

Hunt-class destroyers of the Royal Navy
1941 ships
Ships built on the River Clyde